In algebra, the ring of restricted power series is the subring of a formal power series ring that consists of power series whose coefficients approach zero as degree goes to infinity. Over a non-archimedean complete field, the ring is also called a Tate algebra. Quotient rings of the ring are used in the study of a formal algebraic space as well as rigid analysis, the latter over non-archimedean complete fields.

Over a discrete topological ring, the ring of restricted power series coincides with a polynomial ring; thus, in this sense, the notion of "restricted power series" is a generalization of a polynomial.

Definition 
Let A be a linearly topologized ring, separated and complete and  the fundamental system of open ideals. Then the ring of restricted power series is defined as the projective limit of the polynomial rings over :
.
In other words, it is the completion of the polynomial ring  with respect to the filtration .

Clearly, the ring  can be identified with the subring of the formal power series ring  that consists of series  with coefficients ; i.e., each  contains all but finitely many coefficients .

extending .

Tate algebra 

is called a Tate algebra, named for John Tate.

This makes  a Banach algebra over k; i.e., a normed algebra that is complete as a metric space.

Some key results are:
Then for each , there exist a unique  and a unique polynomial  of degree  such that

(Weierstrass preparation) As above, let  be a -distinguished series of order s. Then there exist a unique monic polynomial  of degree  and a unit element  such that .
(Noether normalization) If  is an ideal, then there is a finite homomorphism .

As consequence of the division, preparation theorems and Noether normalization,  is a Noetherian unique factorization domain of Krull dimension n. An analog of Hilbert's Nullstellensatz is valid: the radical of an ideal is the intersection of all maximal ideals containing the ideal (we say the ring is Jacobson).

Results 

Results for polynomial rings such as Hensel's lemma, division algorithms (or the theory of Gröbner bases) are also true for the ring of restricted power series. Throughout the section, let A denote a linearly topologized ring, separated and complete.

(Hensel) Let  a maximal ideal and  the quotient map.
.

Notes

References

See also 
Weierstrass preparation theorem

External links 
https://ncatlab.org/nlab/show/restricted+formal+power+series
http://math.stanford.edu/~conrad/papers/aws.pdf
https://web.archive.org/web/20060916051553/http://www-math.mit.edu/~kedlaya//18.727/tate-algebras.pdf

Mathematical analysis